Devil's Canyon in Canadian County, Oklahoma was designated a National Natural Landmark in December 1974. It was identified as having several different mesic plants in a diverse environment of oak woodland/tall prairie grass and eastern deciduous forest.  It is privately owned.

References

External links
Map including Devil's Canyon

National Natural Landmarks in Oklahoma
Geography of Canadian County, Oklahoma